Robin Jäätma (born 5 March 2001) is an Estonian archer competing in compound events. He won the bronze medal in the men's individual compound event at the 2021 World Archery Championships held in Yankton, United States. He became the first archer to win a medal for Estonia in the history of the World Archery Championships.

In 2019, Jäätma and his sister Lisell Jäätma won the gold medal in the mixed team compound event at the Summer Universiade held in Naples, Italy. They won the silver medal in the mixed team compound event at the 2021 European Archery Championships held in Antalya, Turkey. They also won the silver medal in this event at the 2022 European Archery Championships held in Munich, Germany. He also won the bronze medal in the men's individual compound event.

He represented Estonia at the 2022 World Games held in Birmingham, United States. He competed in the men's individual compound event.

References

External links
 

Living people
2001 births
Estonian male archers
Universiade medalists in archery
Universiade gold medalists for Estonia
Competitors at the 2019 Summer Universiade
Medalists at the 2019 Summer Universiade
World Archery Championships medalists
Sportspeople from Paide
Competitors at the 2022 World Games
21st-century Estonian people